Don Fray Francisco de Vitoria, O.P. (1540 - 1592) was a Roman Catholic prelate who served as Bishop of Córdoba (1578–1592).

Biography
Francisco de Vitoria attended Estudio de Escuelas Generales de Alcaláwas (Modern name Complutense University of Madrid). He was ordained as a priest in the Order of Preachers. On 13 January 1578, he was appointed during the papacy of Pope Gregory XIII as Bishop of Córdoba. On 18 November 1578, he was consecrated bishop. He served as Bishop of Córdoba until his death in 1592.

Family 
De Vitoria's family was of Jewish heritage and his father, Duarte Nunez, was a New Christian. He was the brother of Abraham Curiel and the paternal uncle of Jacob Curiel.

References 

16th-century Roman Catholic bishops in Argentina
Bishops appointed by Pope Gregory XIII
1592 deaths
Curiel family
Portuguese people of Jewish descent
Spanish Roman Catholic bishops in South America
Roman Catholic bishops of Córdoba
Dominican bishops
1540 births